A Grand Tourer Injection (from Italian Gran Turismo Iniezione) -  abbreviated to GTI or GTi - is a fuel-injection car model variant. Traditionally used for grand tourer cars, the term is now applied to various hot hatchbacks, even though they do not have the luxury traditionally associated with grand tourers.

The 1961 Maserati 3500 GTi is the first car to use the GTI name that was later made famous in 1976 with the  Volkswagen Golf GTI and also by the Peugeot 205 GTi launched in 1984.

Examples
GTI models include:

Audi Fox GTi B1 (North America)
Chevrolet Aveo GTi T200/250 (Colombia)
Citroën AX GTI
Citroën BX GTI
Citroën CX GTI
Citroën Visa GTI
Dacia Nova GTI
Daewoo Racer GTi
Daihatsu Charade GTI G201 (Europe)
Ford Escort GTi Mk6 (Europe)
Honda Civic GTI EF/EG (New Zealand)
Isuzu Gemini GTI 16V JT190 (Europe)
Lada 110/111/112 GTi
Lada Kalina GTi (prototype)
Maserati 3500 GTI
Maserati Sebring 3500/3700/4000 GTI
Mazda 323 GTi BF/BG (Finland/United Kingdom)
Mazda 323F GTI (The Netherlands)
Mazda 626 GTi GD (Finland/United Kingdom)
Mitsubishi Eterna/Galant GTI-16V E33A (Asia/Europe/Indonesia)
Mitsubishi Lancer GTI-16V C53A/C58A/CB5A (Asia)
Mitsubishi Colt GTI-16V/GTi-S C53A/C58A/CB5A (Europe)
Nissan 100NX GTI (Europe)
Nissan Almera GTi N15 (Europe)
Nissan Bluebird Turbo GTi T12/72 (Europe)
Nissan Cherry GTi N12 (Europe)
Nissan Pulsar/Sunny GTi/GTiR N13/14 (Japan/Australia/Europe)
Peugeot 106 GTI
Peugeot 205 GTI
Peugeot 206 GTI
Peugeot 207 GTI
Peugeot 208 GTi
Peugeot 306 GTi
Peugeot 308 GTi
Peugeot 309 GTI\GTI16
Peugeot 505 GTI
Proton Satria GTi
Rover 216/220 GTi
Rover 25 GTi
Rover 416 GTi
Rover Metro/114 GTi
SEAT Ibiza GTI Mk2
SEAT Toledo GTI Mk1
Suzuki Cultus/Forsa/Swift GTi Mk1/2
Toyota Carina E GTi (Europe)
Toyota Celica GT-i16 ST162/182 (Europe)
Toyota Corolla GTi AE92 (Asia/Australia/Europe)
Toyota Corolla Coupé GTi AE86 (Austria/Switzerland)
Volkswagen Gol/Pointer (Mk2)/Parati GTi (Latin America)
Volkswagen Golf GTI 
Volkswagen Lupo GTI
Volkswagen Passat GTi B1 (prototype)
Volkswagen Pointer GTi Mk1 (Latin America)
Volkswagen Polo GTI
Volkswagen Rabbit GTI (United States/Canada)
Volkswagen Scirocco GTi Mk1/2
Volskwagen up! GTI

References

Grand tourers
Hot hatches